Mount Marcus Baker (Ahtna: Ts'itonhna Dghilaaye’; Dena'ina: Ch'atanhtnu Dghelaya) is the highest peak of the Chugach Mountains of Alaska. 
This peak is very prominent because of its proximity to tidewater and is only 12 miles (19 km) north of the calving face of Harvard Glacier. 
When ranked by topographic prominence, Mount Marcus Baker is one of the top 75 peaks in the world.

History 
Mount Marcus Baker was originally called "Mount Saint Agnes"; according to Bradford Washburn, James W. Bagley of the USGS named it after his wife Agnes, adding the "Saint" in hopes of making the name stick. The name was later changed to honor a cartographer and geologist named Marcus Baker.

The peak was first climbed on June 19, 1938 by a party led by famed explorer Bradford Washburn; the climb took almost two months owing to weather delays. Today's standard route is the North Ridge. Despite being much lower in elevation than Denali, Marcus Baker is a similarly serious ascent, due to the remoteness of the peak and the resulting length of the approach and climb.  A number of noted climbers have perished or sustained permanent injury in attempting to summit the peak as climbing conditions can change rapidly as storms arise.  In early 1988, a State of Alaska Fish and Game biologist, 28-year-old Sylvia Jean Lane, succumbed to hypothermia as a two-day storm separated her from the two others in the climbing party attempting to dash to the top in a winter ascent.

See also

List of mountain peaks of North America
List of mountain peaks of the United States
List of mountain peaks of Alaska
List of Ultras of the United States

References

External links

Alaskan peaks with prominence > 1500m
Mount Marcus Baker on bivouac.com

Marcus Baker, Mount
Marcus
North American 4000 m summits